This is a list of Portuguese football transfers for the summer of 2013. The summer transfer window opened on 1 July and closed at midnight on 2 September. Players may be bought before the transfer windows opens, but may only join their new club on 1 July. Only moves involving Primeira Liga clubs are listed. Additionally, players without a club may join a club at any time.

Transfers

 A player who signed with a club before the opening of the summer transfer window, will officially join his new club on 1 July. While a player who joined a club after 1 July will join his new club following his signature of the contract.

References

External links
 Primeira Liga Transfers

2013–14 in Portuguese football
Football transfers summer 2013
Lists of Portuguese football transfers